Mesmogtinden is a mountain in Vågå Municipality in Innlandet county, Norway. The mountain is surrounded by several other notable mountains including Store Svartdalspiggen to the northwest, Langedalstinden to the southwest, Kvitskardtinden to the southeast, and Knutsholstinden to the northeast. There is a glacier to the east and the west of the mountain peak.

See also
List of mountains of Norway by height

References

Jotunheimen
Vågå
Mountains of Innlandet